Kundelungu National Park is a national park of the Democratic Republic of the Congo, located in Haut-Katanga Province. The park was first established in 1970.

The ecosystem is mainly grassy savannah on large steppes dotted with forest galleries, characteristics of Katanga. Fauna found in the park include antelopes, jackals, porcupines, warthogs, snakes, monkeys, buffalos, hippopotamuses and bird species including egrets, marabou storks and pelicans.

Kundelungu is an IUCN Category II park.

References

National parks of the Democratic Republic of the Congo
Protected areas established in 1970
IUCN Category II
1970 establishments in Africa
Central Zambezian miombo woodlands